Psychrobacter proteolyticus is a species of bacteria first isolated from the Antarctic krill Euphausia superba. It excretes a cold-adapted metalloprotease. It is a strictly aerobic, strongly oxidase-positive, psychrotrophic, halotolerant, Gram-negative nonmotile coccobacillus; its type strain is CIP106830T (=DSM13887).

References

Further reading

External links
LPSN
Type strain of Psychrobacter proteolyticus at BacDive -  the Bacterial Diversity Metadatabase

Moraxellaceae
Bacteria described in 2001